Fort Mitchell is a home rule-class city in Kenton County, Kentucky, United States. The population was 8,702 at the 2020 census. It is part of the Cincinnati metropolitan area.

History
Fort Mitchell was the site of one of seven Civil War fortifications built for the Defense of Cincinnati. The community was named for General Ormsby M. Mitchel, a professor at Cincinnati College (now the University of Cincinnati) who designed the fortifications.

Fort Mitchell was chartered as a city in 1910. It annexed South Ft. Mitchell (inc. 1927) in 1967 and Crescent Park in 1999.

Geography
Fort Mitchell is located at  (39.047221, -84.559993).

Demographics

2010 census
At the 2010 census, there were 8,207 people, 3,530 households, and 2,033 families living in the city. The racial makeup of the city was 96.87% White, 0.99% African American, 0.10% Native American, 0.80% Asian, 0.02% Pacific Islander, 0.47% from other races, and 0.74% from two or more races. Hispanic or Latino of any race were 0.85% of the population.

Of the 3,446 households 28.9% had children under the age of 18 living with them, 45.2% were married couples living together, 9.3% had a female householder with no husband present, and 42.4% were non-families. 35.6% of households were one person and 11.3% were one person aged 65 or older. The average household size was 2.29 and the average family size was 3.05.

The age distribution was 23.9% under 18, 9.9% from 18 to 24, 30.4% from 25 to 44, 22.6% from 45 to 64, and 13.3% who were 65 or older. The median age was 36 years. For every 100 females, there were 90.8 males. For every 100 females age 18 and over, there were 86.4 males.

The median household income was $46,335 and the median family income  was $63,910. Full-time male workers had a median income of $41,358 versus $29,873 for females. The per capita income for the city was $29,229. As of the 2000 census, about 2.6% of families and 3.4% of the population were below the poverty line, including 2.7% of those under age 18 and 2.4% of those age 65 or over.

2000 census
At the 2000 census there were 8,089 people, 3,530 households, and 2,033 families living in the city. The racial makeup of the city was 96.87% White, 0.99% African American, 0.10% Native American, 0.80% Asian, 0.02% Pacific Islander, 0.47% from other races, and 0.74% from two or more races. Hispanic or Latino of any race were 0.85%.

Of the 3,530 households 28.9% had children under the age of 18 living with them, 45.2% were married couples living together, 9.3% had a female householder with no husband present, and 42.4% were non-families. 35.6% of households were one person and 11.3% were one person aged 65 or older. The average household size was 2.29 and the average family size was 3.05.

The age distribution was 23.9% under the age of 18, 9.9% from 18 to 24, 30.4% from 25 to 44, 22.6% from 45 to 64, and 13.3% 65 or older. The median age was 36 years. For every 100 females, there were 90.8 males. For every 100 females age 18 and over, there were 86.4 males.

The median household income was $46,335 and the median family income  was $63,910. Males had a median income of $41,358 versus $29,873 for females. The per capita income for the city was $29,229. About 2.6% of families and 3.4% of the population were below the poverty line, including 2.7% of those under age 18 and 2.4% of those age 65 or over.

Culture
 The world's only ventriloquist museum, the Vent Haven Museum, is in Fort Mitchell.

Education
Fort Mitchell is home to the Beechwood Independent School District, a public K-12 institution and Blessed Sacrament is a Catholic K-8 institution.  Beechwood High School was ranked #333 on the U.S. News & World Report 2015 list of best high schools nationwide.

Notable people
 Ryan Poston- murder victim

References

External links
 Official website
 Historical Texts and Images of Fort Mitchell, Kentucky
 Fort Mitchell, American Civil War fort

Cities in Kentucky
Kentucky in the American Civil War
Mitchell
1909 establishments in Kentucky
Populated places established in 1909
Cities in Kenton County, Kentucky